Anemosa was a village of ancient Arcadia in the district Maenalia on the Helisson.

Its site near modern Piana.

References

Populated places in ancient Arcadia
Former populated places in Greece